Miss Philippines Earth 2023 will be the 23rd edition of the Miss Philippines Earth pageant. Jenny Ramp of Santa Ignacia, Tarlac will crown her successor at the end of the event.

Background

Selection of Participants
On January 13, 2023, the organization launched its search for the next Filipina earth-warrior who will represent the Philippines at the Miss Earth 2023 competition.

Candidates
31 contestants representing various cities, municipalities, and communities abroad will compete for the title.

Notes

References

Beauty pageants in the Philippines
2023
Earth, Philippines
2023 in the Philippines